Yinzibing (阴滋病) refers to an unverified disease. AIDS-like symptoms were reported by people who suspected or claimed that they had caught such disease, but these people were negative in the HIV tests.

Names
The term was coined from "yīnxìng (negative)", "àizī (AIDS)", and "bìng (disease)". It was also referred to as "Yinxing Aizibing" (阴性艾滋病, HIV-negative AIDS).

History
In 2011, there were rumors that an AIDS-like disease was spreading in Mainland China, which got the attention of the media of China and Hong Kong. Related news coverages circulated on the internet, got attention of internet users, and reminded people of the time of SARS. It was reported that people with "yinzibing" had AIDS-like symptoms such as hypodermic hemorrhage, weak immune system, swollen lymph glands, etc., but they were negative in HIV tests. An investigation had been started in places with more cases such as Beijing, Shanghai, Zhejiang, Hunan, Jiangsu, and Guangdong. The Chinese Ministry of Health had conducted an epidemiological investigation. 

The Disease Prevention and Control Bureau of China stated that no new virus was found and that the so-called yinzibing was a mental health problem as an AIDS phobia. However, an epidemiological investigation conducted in 2013 concluded that this disease cannot be completely explained by mental disorder.

Yinzibing, the next global pandemic ?  
This unknown pathogen (Yinzibing) has since crossed borders and spread throughout the world. The forums dedicated to sexually transmitted diseases (STD) are daily fed with testimonies of people reporting an infection and symptoms referring to Yinzibing. Following this alarming sanitary report, a group of European patients created in 2022 a website in order to convince the medical authorities to scientifically study the subject. We invite you to consult it at the following address: https://newcontagiousunknownpathogen.wordpress.com/.
Moreover, a new scientific study about Yinzibing will be launched in the 2nd quarter of 2023 in a governmental laboratory in the UK at the initiative of this European patients group. The study results will be published soon.

References 

2011 in China
HIV/AIDS